North Smithfield is a town in Providence County, Rhode Island, United States, settled as a farming community in 1666 and incorporated into its present form in 1871. North Smithfield includes the historic villages of Forestdale, Primrose, Waterford, Branch Village, Union Village, Park Square, Cassidyland, Boutelleville and Slatersville. The population was 12,588 at the 2020 census.

Geography
North Smithfield is in a New England upland region. The Branch River and Blackstone Rivers provided much of the power for the early mills in the town. The town consists mainly of temperate forests, with minor elevation changes. At , Woonsocket Hill in North Smithfield is one of the highest points in Rhode Island. Residents can expect mild summers and harsh winters.

History

In the 17th century British colonists settled in North Smithfield developing a farming community that they named after Smithfield, London in England.  The town was part of Smithfield, Rhode Island until it was incorporated as North Smithfield in 1871. The first colonization occurred after a Native American, "William Minnian" (also known as "Quashawannamut") a Praying Indian from Punkkupage Massachusetts Bay, on May 14, 1666, and again in 1669 with the permission of King Philip, deeded approximately 2,000 acres" to John Mowry and Edward Inman who partnered with Nathaniel Mowry, John Steere, and Thomas Walling in dividing up the purchased tract. During King Philip's War in 1676 Connecticut militia forces killed the last Narragansett sachem, Queen Quaiapen, and Stonewall John in Mattity Swamp in what is now North Smithfield in the Second Battle of Nipsachuck. In the early 18th century, a Quaker colony developed in what is now North Smithfield (then Smithfield), which extended into south Uxbridge, Massachusetts.

Today North Smithfield is part of the John H. Chaffee Blackstone River Valley National Heritage Corridor. The Blackstone Valley is the oldest industrialized region in the U.S. A local North Smithfield industry today, Berroco Yarns, is a continuation of an original family owned woolen company first established in this valley by Daniel Day in 1809.
 The village of Slatersville was largely built by Samuel Slater and his brother John Slater beginning in 1803. It is a well-preserved original New England mill village with worker housing and commercial buildings and a church on a village green. This village is in fact America's first planned industrial mill village. Samuel and John's family owned this mill and the village until the turn of the 20th century.

Union Village, along Rhode Island Route 146A achieved local prominence as an important stagecoach stop on the route along Great Road. Union Village was also home to a hat shop, taverns, an academy and the Union Bank from which the village got its name.  The North Smithfield Public Library was founded in 1931 with the first branch in the Union Village school. In 1965 Fogarty Hospital was constructed in the town.

In the nineteenth and early twentieth-century, North Smithfield "was served by several trolley and railroad lines; now all are gone save one.  A freight-only spur line of the Providence and Worcester Railroad extends from the main line in Woonsocket and terminates [in Slatersville] at the Providence Pike" where it "primarily serves a single customer, a steel supplier called Denman and Davis," a company in Slatersville which is now part of O’Neal Steel, Inc.

Demographics

As of the census of 2000, there were 10,618 people, 3,954 households, and 2,957 families residing in the town. The racial makeup of the town was 98.32% White, 0.42% African American, 0.21% Native American, 0.52% Asian, 0.08% from other races, and 0.45% from two or more races. Hispanic or Latino people of any race were 0.47% of the population. 41% reported either French or French Canadian ancestry, 12% Irish, 12% Italian, and 8% English.

There were 3,954 households, out of which 31.0% had children under the age of 18 living with them, 64.0% were married couples living together, 7.8% had a female householder with no husband present, and 25.2% were non-families. 21.3% of all households were made up of individuals, and 12.4% had someone living alone who was 65 years of age or older.  The average household size was 2.61 and the average family size was 3.05.

In the town, the population was spread out, with 22.4% under the age of 18, 5.7% from 18 to 24, 27.2% from 25 to 44, 26.8% from 45 to 64, and 18.0% who were 65 years of age or older.  The median age was 42 years. For every 100 females, there were 90.4 males.  For every 100 females age 18 and over, there were 86.8 males.

The median income for a household in the town was $58,602, and the median income for a family was $67,331. Males had a median income of $43,133 versus $30,748 for females. The per capita income for the town was $25,031.  About 1.9% of families and 3.5% of the population were below the poverty line, including 2.8% of those under age 18 and 9.9% of those age 65 or over.

Historic places in North Smithfield

 Second Battle of Nipsachuck Battlefield, site of 1676 battle during King Philip's War
 Slatersville, America's first industrial mill village, established by John Slater and Samuel Slater in 1807
 Smithfield Friends Meeting House, Parsonage & Cemetery, 18th-19th-century Quaker community
Peleg Arnold Tavern (1690)
Blackstone Valley National Heritage Corridor
Forestdale Mill Village Historic District
Tyler Mowry House (1825)
William Mowry House (1804)
Smithfield Road Historic District
Three Dog Site, RI-151
Todd Farm (1740)
Union Village Historic District

Notable people

 Peleg Arnold, delegate to the Continental Congress (1787–1788); Chief Justice of the Rhode Island Supreme Court (1795–1812)
 Ella Maria Ballou, essayist, stenographer
 Emeline S. Burlingame, evangelist and suffragist
 Joe Connolly, outfielder for the Boston Braves (1913–1916)
 Henry Hobbs, football player and coach
 Jeff Jillson, international hockey defensman 
 Tim McNamara, Boston Braves and New York Giants pitcher (1922–1926); died in North Smithfield
 Joseph O'Donnell Jr., Lieutenant Governor of Rhode Island
 David Rawlings, musician; guitarist with wife Gillian Welch
 John Slater, industrialist, founder of Slatersville
 John Fox Slater, businessman, philanthropist, abolitionist, supporter of freed slaves
 R. E. Streeter, Christian writer; founder of the Pastoral Bible Institute in 1918

Education

The North Smithfield School District consists of four active schools:
North Smithfield High School, the only public high school in the town, was ranked 5th out of 51 public high schools in Rhode Island in 2016.
North Smithfield Elementary School was built in 1989 and is now used for preschool-fourth grade.
North Smithfield Middle School was built for the 2008–2009 school year and now holds grades 5–8.
Dr. Harry L. Halliwell School was built in 1958, and used for grades 3–5. The school was decommissioned in the summer of 2019. Before it became a school, it was a sheep farm.
The Kendall Dean School was built in 1936 but is no longer used as a school. It is currently being used as an administrative building for the town.

Houses of worship
 Lighthouse Christian Church
 Masjid Al-Islam mosque
 Slatersville Congregational Church
 St. John the Evangelist Church

References

External links

Town of North Smithield official website

The Church on the Green at Slatersville, long a Buxton Church
Samuel Slater, Father of the American industrial revolution, Slatersville, the mill village/with photos

 
Towns in Providence County, Rhode Island
Providence metropolitan area
Towns in Rhode Island
1666 establishments in Rhode Island